The Congressional Caucus to End Bullying was a congressional caucus of the United States Congress dedicated to advocacy of bills which target bullying in educational institutions and other establishments with anti-bullying legislation. It was headed by Rep. Mike Honda and was launched on June 28, 2012.It ended in January 2017 when Rep. Mike Honda lost his bid for reelection.

Members
 Rep. Mike Honda (D - CA) - Chairman
 Rep. Joe Baca (D - CA)
 Rep. Madeleine Bordallo (D - Guam)
 Rep. Lois Capps (D - CA)
 Rep. Russ Carnahan (D - MO)
 Rep. Judy Chu (D - CA)
 Rep. Hansen Clarke (D - MI)
 Rep. Steve Cohen (D - TN)
 Rep. John Conyers (D - GA)
 Rep. Charles Bass (R - N.H.)
 Rep. Robert Dold (R - Ill.)
 Rep. Keith Ellison (D - MN)
 Rep. Raúl Grijalva (D - AZ)
 Rep. Luis Gutiérrez (D - IL)
 Rep. Janice Hahn (D - CA)
 Rep. Alcee Hastings (D - FL)
 Rep. Brian Higgins (D - N.Y.)
 Rep. Eleanor Holmes Norton (D - D.C.)
 Rep. Kathy Hochul (D - N.Y.)
 Rep. Sheila Jackson Lee (D - TX)
 Rep. Barbara Lee (D - CA)
 Rep. Frank LoBiondo (R - N.J.)
 Rep. Dave Loebsack (D - IA)
 Rep. Betty McCollum (D - MN)
 Rep. Gregory Meeks (D - N.Y.)
 Rep. Frank Pallone (D - N.J.)
 Rep. Bill Pascrell (D - N.Y.)
 Rep. Gary Peters (D - MI)
 Rep. Jared Polis (D - CO)
 Rep. Nick Rahall (D - W.V.)
 Rep. Silvestre Reyes (D - TX)
 Rep. Laura Richardson (D - CA)
 Rep. Lucille Roybal-Allard (D - CA)
 Rep. Gregorio Sablan (D - Northern Marianas)
 Rep. Linda Sánchez (D - CA)
 Rep. Pete Stark (D - CA)
 Rep. Edolphus Towns (D - N.Y.)
 Rep. Maxine Waters (D - CA)
 Rep. Melvin Watt (D - N.C.)
 Rep. Henry Waxman (D - CA)
 Rep. Frederica Wilson (D - FL)

References

Website
 Website

Anti-bullying campaigns
Caucuses of the United States Congress